The Feist–Benary synthesis is an organic reaction between α-halogen ketones and β-dicarbonyl compounds to produce substituted furan compounds. This condensation reaction is catalyzed by amines such as ammonia and pyridine. The first step in the ring synthesis is related to the Knoevenagel condensation. In the second step the enolate displaces an alkyl halogen in a nucleophilic aliphatic substitution.

A recent modification is the enantioselective interrupted Feist-Benary reaction with a chiral auxiliary based on the cinchona alkaloid quinine based in the presence of proton sponge to the hydroxydihydrofuran. This type of alkaloids is also used in asymmetric synthesis in the AD-mix. The alkaloid is protonated throughout the reaction and transfers its chirality by interaction of the acidic ammonium hydrogen with the dicarbonyl group of ethyl bromopyruvate in a 5-membered transition state.

References 

Oxygen heterocycle forming reactions
Heterocycle forming reactions
Name reactions